is a passenger railway station on the Kawagoe Line located in the city of Kawagoe, Saitama, Japan, operated by East Japan Railway Company (JR East).

Lines

Station layout
The station has one side platform serving a single bidirectional track. The station building is adjacent to the south side of the track. The station is staffed.

Platforms

History
The station opened on 22 July 1940. With the privatization of JNR on 1 April 1987, the station came under the control of JR East.

Passenger statistics
In fiscal 2019, the station was used by an average of 2933 passengers daily (boarding passengers only).

The passenger figures for previous years are as shown below.

Surrounding area
 Chikōzan Park
 Kasumigaseki Country Club, a planned venue for the 2020 Summer Olympics 
 Bunri University of Hospitality
 Kawagoe Nishi High School
 Shūmei High School
 Kasumigaseki Nishi Junior High School

See also
 List of railway stations in Japan

References

External links

 Kasahata Station information (JR East) 
 Kasahata Station information (Saitama Prefectural Government) 

Railway stations in Saitama Prefecture
Railway stations in Japan opened in 1940
Kawagoe Line
Stations of East Japan Railway Company
Railway stations in Kawagoe, Saitama